Araik Baghdadyan (born 29 August 1973) is a retired Armenian Freestyle wrestler and coach.

Baghdadyan won a silver medal at the 1994 European Wrestling Championships. Baghdadyan is now the chief coach of Armenia's freestyle wrestling team.

References

1973 births
Living people
Armenian wrestlers
Armenian male sport wrestlers
European Wrestling Championships medalists